Alexandra Ivanovna Zabelina (11 March 1937 – 27 March 2022) was a Soviet fencer. She won gold medals in the team foil at the 1960, 1968 and 1972 Summer Olympics.

Between 1956 and 1971 Zabelina won eight team and two individual world titles in the foil. She won the individual Silver Prize at the 1961 and 1966 world championships and team Silver Prize in 1959, 1962, 1967, and 1969. She missed the 1964 Summer Olympics because she was expecting her son.

Zabelina first trained in gymnastics, but had to quit due to an injury. In retirement she worked as a fencing coach. Her students included the Olympic champion Maria Mazina.

References

External links

1937 births
2022 deaths
Russian female foil fencers
Soviet female foil fencers
Olympic fencers of the Soviet Union
Olympic gold medalists for the Soviet Union
Fencers at the 1960 Summer Olympics
Fencers at the 1968 Summer Olympics
Fencers at the 1972 Summer Olympics
Olympic medalists in fencing
Martial artists from Moscow
Medalists at the 1960 Summer Olympics
Medalists at the 1968 Summer Olympics
Medalists at the 1972 Summer Olympics